The Wheatsheaf Hall is a former Congregational Church mission hall in Vauxhall, south London. It is a grade II listed building.

It opened in 1896 as the Wheatsheaf Congregational Church Mission and was used as a mission hall and public library until 1939. In 1980 Lambeth Council started the process to turn it into a tenants' hall and community centre. It opened in 1988 as Wheatsheaf Hall Community Centre.  In 2020 it was used as a COVID-19 testing centre as part of NHS Test and Trace. 

It is also used a venue for music charity "In Harmony" and is often rented out for private use.

References

External links 
 

Grade II listed buildings in the London Borough of Lambeth
Vauxhall
Methodist churches in London
Grade II listed churches in London